The 1925 All-Western college football team consists of American football players selected to the All-Western teams chosen by various selectors for the 1925 college football season.

All-Western selections

Ends
 LaVern Dilweg, Marquette (WE-1)
 Bennie Oosterbaan, Michigan (WE-1) (CFHOF)
 Ted Sloane, Drake (WE-2)
 Chuck Kassel, Illinois (WE-2)
 Elmer A. Lampe, Chicago (WE-3)
 William Flora, Michigan (WE-3)

Tackles
 Ed Weir, Nebraska (WE-1) (CFHOF)
 Tom Edwards, Michigan (WE-1)
 Fred Henderson, Chicago (WE-2)
 Ed Lindenmeyer, Missouri (WE-2)
 Paul Nelson, Wisconsin (WE-3)
 Harry Hawkins, Michigan (WE-3)

Guards
 Ed Hess, Ohio State (WE-1)
 Leonard Walsh, Minnesota (WE-1)
 Ray J. Stipek, Wisconsin (WE-2)
 Stan Kuick, Beloit (WE-2)
 John Lovette, Michigan (WE-3)
 Merwin Mitterwallner, Illinois (WE-3)

Centers
 Harold Hutchison, Nebraska (WE-1)
 Tim Lowry, Northwestern (WE-2)
 Robert J. Brown, Michigan (WE-3)

Quarterbacks
 Benny Friedman, Michigan (WE-1) (CFHOF/PFHOF)
 Olin Hatfield Chilson, Colorado (WE-2)
 John Schirmer, Iowa (WE-3)

Halfbacks
 Red Grange, Illinois (WE-1) (CFHOF/PFHOF)
 Doyle Harmon, Wisconsin (WE-1)
 John Rhodes, Nebraska (WE-2)
 Sam Whiteman, Missouri (WE-2)
 Lawrence E. Marks, Indiana (WE-3)
 Marty Karow, Ohio State (WE-3)

Fullbacks
 Rex Enright, Notre Dame (WE-1)
 Austin McCarty, Chicago (WE-2)
 Loren L. Lewis, Northwestern (WE-3)

Key
WE = Walter Eckersall in the Chicago Tribune

CFHOF = College Football Hall of Fame

PFHOF = Pro Football Hall of Fame

See also
1925 College Football All-America Team
1925 All-Big Ten Conference football team
 1925 All-Eastern football team

References

1925 Big Ten Conference football season
All-Western college football teams